XERY-AM is a radio station on 1450 AM in Arcelia, Guerrero, Mexico. It is owned by Rafael García Tapia and known as La Poderosa Voz del Sur.

History
XERY received its concession on November 25, 1971.

XERY was cleared for AM-AM migration in 2011 as XHRY-FM 94.3. In 2013, the legal representative for XERY opted to renounce its authorization to move to FM, leaving XERY as an AM-only station for the foreseeable future.

References

1971 establishments in Mexico
Radio stations established in 1971
Radio stations in Guerrero
Spanish-language radio stations